Severiano de Heredia (8 November 1836 – 9 February 1901) was a Cuban-born biracial politician, a freemason, a left-wing republican, naturalized as French in 1870, who was president of the municipal council of Paris from 1 August 1879 to 12 February 1880, making him the only native of the American continent who was appointed on relevant post of the Mayor of Paris and the first mayor of African descent of a Western world capital.

In 1880, he succeeded Victor Hugo in the presidency of the Philotechnical Association. He served in the Chamber of Deputies from 1881 to 1889 and was briefly Minister of Public Works for the cabinet of Maurice Rouvier in 1887, at the time when the Eiffel Tower first started being built, where he planned and oversaw the construction of some of the finest French highways. He is believed to be a cousin of the famous French poet José-Maria de Heredia.

Biography

Personal life
Severiano de Heredia was born in Matanzas, Cuba, to Henri de Heredia and mulatta Beatrice Cardenas. Reportedly he was the natural son of his godfather Don Ignacio Heredia y Campuzano-Polanco married to the French Madeleine Godefroy, who adopted him and sent him to France at the age of 10 for his education, attending the Lycée Louis-le-Grand in Paris. He applied for French citizenship which was granted under the Ministerial Decree of 28 September 1870.

He married at Paris, 3 November 1868, Henriette Hanaire, by whom he had a son in 1869, Henri-Ignace, and a daughter, Marcelle, in 1873. His son died in an accident at Wimereux at the age of twelve and was buried at Cimetière des Batignolles on 4 September 1882. His daughter studied at the Paris Medical School, became a notable neurophysiologist and formed a team with her husband, the neurophysiologist Louis Lapicque.

Political career
Upon the death of his godfather in 1848, Severiano de Heredia inherited his wealth and embarked on a career as a poet and literary critic. In 1871, while he was assuming the role of a conciliator, he published a political essay entitled "Paix et plébiscite" in which he pleaded for a democratic end to the Franco-Prussian war.

He entered politics as a radical Republican and was elected in April 1873 to be a member of the City Council of Paris, for the Ternes and Plaine-de-Monceaux neighborhoods. In 1879, he was elected president of the municipal council of Paris, and in August 1881 member to the Chamber of Deputies, where he stayed until he was defeated at the election of 1889 by a Boulangist opponent. On 30 May 1887, he was appointed Minister of Public Works in the government of Maurice Bouvier, until 11 December 1887. On retiring from politics he devoted himself to the history of literature.

Severiano de Heredia was also an active Freemason. Initiated in 1866 in the "Étoile polaire" lodge of Paris, he became Worshipfull Master of his lodge, and then Deputy of Grand Orient of France in 1875, and President of the Masonic Orphanage. Within this framework, Severiano de Heredia took part to the first French Congress for Women's Rights in 1878, as a French representative of the intended Committee of Initiative, at the Masonic Grand Orient.

Legacy 
Severiano de Heredia was a radical progressive and a secular-minded freethinker, having fought in favor of public school and continuing education. As a strong advocate for the separation of church and state he played a very active role in the struggle for free, secular and compulsory education, professional training and the creation of municipal libraries. As an early ecologist, he devoted himself to improving the electric car.

Some versions claim that his last years were dedicated to work in the development of the electric car, which is why some qualify him as a pioneer of environmentalism. They also say that in this activity he pledged up to the last weight of his fortune, dying in misery. There are no clear precedents in this regard.

Tribute
Severiano de Heredia died of meningitis at his home in Paris, on 9 February 1901. Some one hundred and ten years after his death, historian Paul Estrade found no remaining public recognition for his career in his thoroughly researched biography. The Mairie de Paris announced in 2013 that a walkway in the 17th arrondissement of Paris will be dedicated to de Heredia in the name of equality and diversity. In 2015, a walkway in front of a new building was named rue Severiano de Heredia. In the naming ceremony, the then mayor of Paris, Anne Hidalgo, spoke:

Works
 L'appel au peuple : Paix ou guerre ? (1870)
 Faisons la paix (1871)
 Paix et plébiscite (1871)
 Société des écoles laïques... Appel aux habitants du 17e arrondissement (1873)

See also 
France
French history
French politics
French Third Republic

Notes and references

Bibliography
 Sabine Faivre d'Arcier: Los tres Heredia [The three Heredia], La Habana : Imagen Contemporánea (2012), in Spanish. 
 Paul Estrade: Severiano de Heredia. Ce mulâtre cubain que Paris fit “ maire ”, et la République, ministre [Severiano de Heredia. This Cuban mulatto that Paris came to be "mayor", and the Republic Minister], series: " La boutique de l'histoire ", Les Indes savantes (15 July 2011), in French.

Notes

References 

1836 births
1901 deaths
People from Matanzas
Black French politicians
Republican Union (France) politicians
Transport ministers of France
Members of the 3rd Chamber of Deputies of the French Third Republic
Members of the 4th Chamber of Deputies of the French Third Republic
French abolitionists
French Freemasons
French pacifists
Burials at Batignolles Cemetery
Cuban people of Dominican Republic descent
Cuban people of French descent
French people of Dominican Republic descent
Cuban emigrants to France